Yacef is a surname. Notable people with the surname include:

Hamza Yacef (born 1979), Algerian footballer
Saadi Yacef (1928–2021), Algerian politician

See also
Yace (disambiguation)